Bate Bay is a bay in  southern Sydney, Australia. The bay is south of the  Kurnell peninsula and its foreshore makes up the beaches of  Cronulla.

The beaches of Cronulla from north to south are: Wanda Beach, Elouera Beach, North Cronulla Beach, Cronulla Beach, Blackwoods Beach and Shelly Beach. Local names also apply to various parts of the beach, such as The Wall, between North Cronulla and Elouera, Big Man's Knob to the east of Elouera and Green Hills, to the north of Wanda.

References

 

Kurnell Peninsula
Bays of New South Wales
Sutherland Shire